The Santa Lucía River is a river in Uruguay.

Course
The headwaters of the Santa Lucía River are in the Lavalleja department.  For a large part of its course it forms the limit between the departments of Florida and San José on one bank and Canelones and Montevideo on the other.  Its outlet is the Río de la Plata, forming a small delta, in which Tiger Island is located.

Significance as a watercourse
It is the principal watercourse of southern Uruguay.  It is the primary source of drinking water for Montevideo and other localities in the south of the country.

See also
 Geography of Uruguay#Topography and hydrography

References

External links

Rivers of Uruguay
Río de la Plata
Rivers of Montevideo Department
Rivers of San José Department
Rivers of Canelones Department
Rivers of Florida Department
Rivers of Lavalleja Department